A sandbox is a sandpit, a wide, shallow playground construction to hold sand, often made of wood or plastic. 

Sandbox or sand box may also refer to:

Arts, entertainment, and media
 Sandbox (band), a Canadian rock music group
 Sandbox (Michael Houser album), 2006, or the title track
 Sandbox, a 1987 album by Guided by Voices
 Sandbox Theatre, an experimental theatre group in Minneapolis, Minnesota
 The Sandbox (play), a 1960 one-act play by Edward Albee
 The Sandbox (2012 video game), a 2012 game for mobile phones
  Sandbox (stylized s&box), an in-development game by Facepunch Studios

Computing 
 Sandbox (computer security), a virtual container in which untrusted programs can be safely run
 Sandbox (software development), an environment in which code or content changes can be tested without affecting the original system
 Sandbox (video game editor), a game level editor for Far Cry
 Sandbox effect, in Google Internet search rankings
 Sandbox game, a genre or mode of some video games for open-ended, nonlinear play
 Sandbox Studios, a computer- and video-game developer

Other uses
 Sand box (civil engineering), a device to remove centring
 Sandbox (locomotive), a container that holds sand for use in improving rail adhesion in slippery conditions
 Sandbox (missile) or SS-N-12, a Soviet anti-ship missile
 Sandbox, a container for pounce (calligraphy), used before the invention of blotting paper
 Sandbox therapy, a tool used by child psychologists
 Sandbox tree, the evergreen species Hura crepitans of the spurge family (Euphorbiaceae), also known as possumwood and jabillo, native to tropical regions in the Americas

See also
 Litter box, an indoor sandbox, usually filled with kitty litter, in which house pets are trained to relieve themselves
 Sandboxie, an OS-level virtualization|operating system-level virtualization program